In geology, sima is an antiquated blended term for the lower layer of Earth's crust. This layer is made of rocks rich in magnesium silicate minerals. Typically, when the sima comes to the surface, it is basalt, so sometimes this layer is called the 'ocean layer' of the crust. The sima layer is also called the 'basal crust' or 'basal layer' because it is the lowest layer of the crust. Because the ocean floors are mainly sima, it is also sometimes called the 'oceanic crust'.

The name 'sima' was taken from the first two letters of silica and of magnesia. Comparable is the name 'sial', which is the name for the upper layer of Earth's crust (continental crust).

Petrology 
The sima has a higher density (2800 to 3300 kg/m3) than the sial, which is due to larger amounts of iron and magnesium, and smaller amounts of aluminium.  When the denser sima comes to the surface it forms mafic rocks, or rocks with mafic minerals. The most dense sima has less silica and forms ultramafic rocks.

See also 
 Asthenosphere
 Eduard Suess
 KREEP
 Lithosphere
 Mantle
 Sial

References 

 Bates, R.L., and Jackson, J.A., (1987) Glossary of geology American Geological Institute, Alexandria, Virginia.
 Cottingham, Kenneth. “The Geologist's Vocabulary.” The Scientific Monthly, vol. 72, no. 3, 1951, pp. 154–163. JSTOR, https://www.jstor.org/stable/20222. Accessed 19 June 2020.
 Dilek, Y. and Newcomb, S. (eds.) (2003) Ophiolite Concept and the Evolution of Geological Thought Geological Society of America Special Paper 373, Boulder, Colorado.

Petrology
Structure of the Earth
Earth's crust